Saint-Jacques-de-Néhou (literally Saint-Jacques of Néhou) is a commune in the Manche department in Normandy in north-western France.

See also
Communes of the Manche department

References

Saintjacquesdenehou